HD 2767 is the primary component of a double star located  away in the constellation Andromeda. It is a red giant with a spectral type of K1III and an apparent magnitude of 5.88, thus is visible by the naked eye under favourable conditions.

The secondary is named BD+32 81, has an apparent magnitude of 9.28, and is an F-type star; it shares radial velocity, parallax and proper motion with the primary component. The distance from the primary is estimated as 6,536 AU, while their separation in the sky is 56 arcseconds.

References

External links
 Image HD 2767

Andromeda (constellation)
002767
Double stars
0122
K-type giants
002475
Durchmusterung objects